Lady in Waiting is the second studio album by American southern rock band Outlaws, released in 1976. (See 1976 in music) The album is known for featuring a cover version of "Freeborn Man" (previously recorded by Keith Allison and Paul Revere & the Raiders), which the band popularized and which eventually became a concert favorite. Henry Paul provides lead vocals on the studio track, but Harvey Dalton Arnold, who would join the band for their next studio album, would handle the lead vocal after Paul's departure. It was eventually included on the 1978 live album Bring It Back Alive, with Arnold on vocals.

Music

The songs on Lady in Waiting encompass elements of rock and roll, country, country rock, pop rock, rockabilly, pop jazz and hard rock.

Track listing

Personnel
Billy Jones - guitar, vocals
Frank O'Keefe - bass
Henry Paul - electric guitar, acoustic guitar, vocals
Hughie Thomasson - guitar, vocals
Monte Yoho - drums

Guest
Joe Lala - percussion

Charts

Notes 

Outlaws (band) albums
1976 albums
Albums produced by Paul A. Rothchild
Arista Records albums